Cabinet of Alexis Tsipras can refer to:

 First Cabinet of Alexis Tsipras, January–August 2015
 Second Cabinet of Alexis Tsipras, since September 2015